Felipe González (born 1942) is a Spanish politician.

Felipe González may refer to:

 Felipe González de Ahedo (1702–1792), Spanish navigator and cartographer
 Felipe González de Canales, Spanish agronomist and educator 
 Felipe González González (1947–2023), Mexican politician and entrepreneur
 Felipe González Ruiz (born 1958), Mexican politician